A net laying ship, also known as a net layer, net tender, gate ship or boom defence vessel was a type of naval auxiliary ship.

A net layer's primary function was to lay and maintain steel anti-submarine nets or anti torpedo nets. Nets could be laid around an individual ship at anchor, or harbor entrances or dry docks, or other anchorages. Net laying was potentially dangerous work, and net laying seamen were experts at dealing with blocks, tackles, knots and splicing. As World War II progressed, net layers were pressed into a variety of additional roles including salvage, troop and cargo transport, buoy maintenance, and service as tugboats.

US Navy

1930s
War Plan Orange, the pre-WW2 US plan for war with Japan, anticipated that Pearl Harbor would be too small for the US Navy fleet that would be amassed in Hawaii. Orange anticipated the construction of a large anchorage in Lahaina Roads between the islands of Maui, Lānaʻi, and Molokaʻi. Construction would consist of massive nets and minefields to protect the anchored ships.

Ultimately four large netlayers would be laid down just before and after the attack on Pearl Harbor: USS Monitor (AN-1), USS Montauk (AN-2), USS Osage (AN-3), and USS Saugus (AN-4). It turned out that these ships were not needed. First, dredging significantly enlarged the anchorages in Pearl Harbor. Second, the mobility of aircraft carrier warfare made the large Lahaina Roads anchorage concept obsolete, though smaller nets would still be needed for the entrance channels at advanced bases such as the Naval Base Majuro and Naval Base Ulithi. Third, new technology resulted in lightweight nets that could be handled by smaller vessels. The four large netlayers would be converted to carry and launch amphibious vehicles under the hull classification Landing Ship, Vehicle (LSV).

1940s

Small net layers initially received the hull classification symbol Yard Net Tenders (YN) but 77 were later reclassified as Auxiliary Net Layer Ships (AN). These vessels had two prominent steel "horns" on the bow, used in laying nets. Another 24 vessels which held the (YN) symbol were impressed tugs rather than specially-built craft, and so these were redesignated as Net Tender Tugs (YNT).

The 77 small Auxiliary Net Layers were built in three classes. The first 32, the Aloe-class, were all launched in 1940 (before the attack on Pearl Harbor) and were built of steel. Due to the chronic shortage of steel during the war, the next 40, the Ailanthus-class, were built of wood. The last 15, the Cohoes-class, laid down in 1944 and 1945, were again constructed of steel.

These vessels served in all theatres of war but particularly in the Pacific.  Many of the ships were decommissioned after the war, but some continued in service for several more decades. Net layers were eventually made redundant by advances in underwater detection technology.

There were also at least 43 craft that were classed as Net Gate Craft (YNG); many were simply powered barges.

To transport nets and to otherwise support the net layers, by 1943 specially built cargo ships, designated Net Cargo Ships (AKN), were built. The first of this class was the USS Indus (AKN-1). The  Indus worked in Naval Base Philippines. Finally in 1946, the USS Montauk would be converted back from an LSV to net cargo duties as the USS Galilea (AKN-6).

British and Commonwealth
The United Kingdom and British Commonwealth referred to Net laying ship as “boom defence vessel".

Bar-class boom defence vessel built in the 1940s.
Net-class boom defence vessel built in the 1930s.

Gallery

See also
Wooden boats of World War 2
US Naval Advance Bases
List of auxiliaries of the United States Navy

References

External links
 Photos of HMNZS Endeavour; Antarctic support ship, ex-US netlayer

Auxiliary gateship classes